The High Point Panthers women's soccer team is an NCAA Division I college soccer team representing High Point University as part of the Big South Conference. They play their home games at Vert Stadium in High Point, North Carolina.

History
The team was founded in 1992 as an independent Division II program, and it had a few 10-win seasons from 1993 to 1996, sandwiched by losing seasons in 1992 and 1997–98. In 1999, the Panthers jumped to NCAA Division I and the Big South Conference. The team struggled its first four years with 4- and 5-win seasons. The Panthers entered the 2003 Big South Tournament at 8–9 and the #6 seed, but surprised the conference by capturing the tournament title with a 0–0, 3–2 penalty-kick shootout win over UNC-Asheville to gain the first Division I NCAA tournament bid in High Point Panthers history. In the NCAA tournament, High Point lost 8–0 to eventual champion North Carolina. Forward Jen Evans, the career goals leader, paced the 2003 team with 10 scores, and also played a pivotal role on the 2007 squad that returned to the NCAA tournament. The Panthers once again ran into UNC in the 2007 tournament and lost 6–1, with senior Amy Anzovino providing the lone Panther score in the 55th minute.

Head coach Marty Beall took over in 2009. A long-shot to make the field in the first place, HPU entered the 2009 Big South tournament as the 7 seed at 5–14–1, but took home the conference title with a 0–0, 4–2 penalty kick shootout win over Winthrop. The team was backstopped by senior goalkeeper Marisa Abbott, who brought a 527-minute shutout streak and a whopping 120 saves on the season to the first round of the NCAA tournament, where they faced North Carolina on November 13. North Carolina outshot High Point 31–0. Abbott made 14 saves, a High Point single-game record, but the Tar Heels notched a single goal off a rebound in the 69th minute for a 1–0 win.
The 2009 UNC team sported several future U.S. women's national team players including Tobin Heath, and went on to win the national title.

High Point won Big South Conference regular-season titles in 2010, 2012, 2016, and 2017, with NCAA tournament appearances coming in 2010, 2014, and 2017. In the 2010 NCAA tournament, High Point took a lead over No. 4 Maryland off freshman forward Kelli Joline's goal in the eighth minute, but the Terrapins equalized 21 seconds later and won 4–1. In 2014, High Point took the Big South conference tournament with a 2–2, 5–4 penalty-kick win over Liberty, but fell 8–0 to Virginia. In 2017, the Panthers won the Big South regular season with a 7–1–1 record and rolled to three straight conference tournament wins to capture Beall's third NCAA bid. The Panthers traveled to familiar NCAA Tournament foe North Carolina, where they dropped a 3–0 decision.

In February 2018, following Marty Beall's departure to Richmond, Brandi Fontaine was named HPU's sixth head coach of the Division I era. Fontaine had spent the last nine years as HPU's assistant coach and associate head coach.

Individual awards
Big South Attacking Player of the Year
Kelsey Perrell – 2016
Big South Defensive Player of the Year
Alex Hank – 2015
Big South Freshman of the Year
Skyler Prillaman – 2018
CoSIDA Academic All-American
Becca Hemby – 2013
Big South Coach of the Year
Marty Beall – 2012, 2016
Brandi Fontaine – 2019
Big South Tournament MVP
Stephanie Moenter – 2003
Sara Rager – 2007
Marisa Abbott – 2009
Janay Whittaker – 2010
Jacky Kessler – 2014
Alex Hank – 2017
Big South Scholar-Athlete of the Year
Traci Andersen – 2006
Alex Torriero – 2007
Brielle Spencer – 2010, 2011
Becca Hemby – 2013
Becca Rolfe – 2016

Individual career records

Individual single-season records

Seasons

NCAA tournament results

References

NCAA Division I women's soccer teams
Women's
Soccer clubs in North Carolina